James Joseph Lydon (May 30, 1923 – March 9, 2022) was an American actor and television producer whose career in the entertainment industry began as a teenager during the 1930s.

Early life
Lydon was born in Harrington Park, New Jersey on May 30, 1923, the fifth of nine children. His family was of Irish heritage. He was raised in Bergenfield, New Jersey.

Career
In 1932, Lydon's father, who was an alcoholic, decided to retire from working. This decision forced all of the other family members to seek employment in the depths of the Great Depression. 

In 1937, Jimmy, not knowing what he wanted to do, tried his hand at acting. His first role was Danny in the Broadway play Western Waters. 

He had been allowed to audition for the part after fabricating a list of roles he had previously portrayed. In the next couple of years, he learned the acting craft while performing in plays such as Sunup to Sundown, Prologue to Glory, Sing Out the News, and The Happiest Days. In 1939, he moved with his family to Hollywood to seek film roles.

One of his first starring roles was the title character in the 1940 movie Tom Brown's School Days, also starring Cedric Hardwicke and Freddie Bartholomew. The film was well received by critics, with Variety praising it in a January 1940 review as "sympathetically and skillfully made, with many touching moments and an excellent cast". Lydon was called "believable and moving in the early portions, but too young for the final moments".

Between 1941 and 1944, under contract to Paramount Pictures, Lydon starred as the screechy-voiced, adolescent Henry Aldrich in the movie series of that title. After completing the Aldrich series, the 21-year-old Lydon signed a contract in 1944 with Republic Pictures.

He appeared in the acclaimed 1947 film Life with Father in the role of college-bound Clarence. Variety called Jimmy Lydon's portrayal "effective as the potential Yale man".

He then appeared opposite James Cagney in the 1948 movie The Time of Your Life. From 1949 to 1950, he and Janet Waldo voiced the leading characters in the radio comedy Young Love.

Lydon easily gained roles in the new medium of television. He portrayed Chris Thayer on The First Hundred Years. The show was CBS' first daytime soap opera. It was performed live for three seasons of 300 episodes.

In 1953, he was cast as Murray in the aviation adventure film Island in the Sky, starring John Wayne. He also played Biffen Cardoza on the last six episodes of Rocky Jones, Space Ranger in 1954 and made appearances in Lux Video Theatre and The Christophers. In 1955, he appeared on [[Sergeant Preston of the Yukon (TV series)|Sergeant Preston of the Yukon]] as Johnny Lane, plagued by cabin fever, in the episode titled "The Williwaw".

In 1958, Lydon played the role of Richard in Anne Jeffreys' and Robert Sterling's short-lived sitcom Love That Jill. Lydon appeared in guest roles on Crossroads, Casey Jones, The Life and Legend of Wyatt Earp, Wagon Train, Hennesey, The Twilight Zone, and Tales of the Texas Rangers, as Lt. Jared Evans in the 1958 episode "Warpath". A year later, he guest-starred on the television series Colt .45. Lydon played the role of Willy in the episode "Return to El Paso", with Paul Picerni cast as Jose.

After working increasingly in television in the 1950s, he turned to production and helped to create the detective series 77 Sunset Strip, as well as the sitcom M*A*S*H. He also produced the television adaptation of the film Mister Roberts in 1966 and Roll Out in 1973–1974. Lydon played Captain Henry Aldrich (a reference to his Aldrich movie series) on the latter show.

In 1963, Lydon worked on the western series Temple Houston on the Fall schedule. On orders from studio boss Jack Webb, episodes were put together in two or three days each, something previously thought impossible in television production. Work began on August 7, 1963, with the initial airing set for September 19. Lydon recalls that Webb told the staff: "Fellas, I just sold Temple Houston. We gotta be on the air in four weeks, we can't use the pilot, we have no scripts, no nothing - do it!"

During the 1970s & 1980s, Lydon continued to act on television, with roles on episodes of Gunsmoke, Lou Grant, Simon & Simon, and St. Elsewhere.

Personal life
Lydon married Patricia Pernetti in 1945. The union was dissolved after a brief period. He was married to Betty Lou Nedell from 1952 until her death in January 2022. They had two daughters and two granddaughters.

Lydon died at the age of 98 on March 9, 2022, at his home in San Diego, California.

Filmography
Film

Short subjects:Home Early (1939) as Junior Doakes (uncredited)A Letter from Bataan (1942) as Chuck LewisThe Aldrich Family Gets in the Scrap (1943) as Henry AldrichCaribbean Romance (1943) as Peter ConwayThe Shining Future (1944) as Danny AmesRoad to Victory (1944) as Danny AmesTime to Kill'' (1945) as Lou

References

External links

 
 

1923 births
2022 deaths
American male stage actors
American male film actors
American male television actors
American male radio actors
Television producers from California
Paramount Pictures contract players
American people of Irish descent
People from Bergenfield, New Jersey
People from Harrington Park, New Jersey
Male actors from New Jersey
Male actors from Los Angeles
People from Bonita, California
Television producers from New Jersey